John Ewing (3 November 1844 – 30 August 1922) was a New Zealand goldminer. He was born in Bonhill, Dunbartonshire, Scotland on 3 November 1844.

References

1844 births
1922 deaths
New Zealand miners
People from Bonhill